This is a list of Furman Paladins football players in the NFL Draft.

Key

Selections

References

Furman

Furman Paladins NFL Draft